Gary Thomas may refer to:

Gary Thomas (academic) (1938–2008), American academic
Gary Thomas (author) (born 1961), American Christian writer
Gary Thomas (cricketer, born 1973), English cricketer
Gary Thomas (cricketer, born 1958), English cricketer
Gary Thomas (musician) (born 1960), American jazz saxophonist
Father Gary Thomas, American exorcist and consultant to the film The Rite
Gary L. Thomas (game designer), American game designer
Gary W. Thomas (1938–2017), American prosecutor and judge wounded in the Marin County courthouse incident
Gary L. Thomas (general) (born 1962), U.S. Marine Corps general

See also
USS Thomas J. Gary (DE-326), an Edsall-class destroyer escort
Gareth Thomas (disambiguation)